Emperor Frederick may refer to:

 Frederick Barbarossa (Frederick I), Holy Roman Emperor
 Frederick II, Holy Roman Emperor (1194–1250)
 Frederick III, Holy Roman Emperor (1415–1493)
 Frederick III, German Emperor, first Hohenzollern German emperor
 Emperor Frederick, evil emperor in the Dune II game